Mykola Polyakov (ukr. Микола Вікторович Поляков; 1 May 1946 – 21 September 2020) was a Ukrainian scientist and rector of Dnipropetrovsk National University.

Biography 
Mykola Polyakov was born on 1 May 1946 in Dnipropetrovsk, USSR. In 1971 Polyakov graduated from Dnipropetrovsk National University specializing in mathematics. In 1974 he obtained his Kandidat Nauk (PhD) degree, in 1983 – Doktor Nauk (Habilitation) degree. During his student years, Polyakov was a Komsomol activist and a member of the Communist Party. Between 1989 and 1996 he was the dean of the mechanics-mathematics faculty. Between 1996 and 1998 Polyakov was a vice-rector of the DNU. In 1998 he was promoted to rector. Polyakov was the author of more than 300 scientific articles, books and inventions. Mykola Polyakov was the chief-editor of the scientific magazine "The Bulletin of the Dnipropetrovsk National University".

In 2010 Mykola Polyakov joined the Party of Regions. On October 31, 2010 he won the local election. He was a member of Dnipropetrovsk city council.

External links
 http://www.dnu.dp.ua/view/history
 http://dniprograd.org/ua/articles/sosiety/856
 http://www.nbuv.gov.ua/portal/natural/tmekh/polyakov.html

2020 deaths
Ukrainian mathematicians
1946 births
Academic staff of Oles Honchar Dnipro National University
Oles Honchar Dnipro National University alumni
Laureates of the State Prize of Ukraine in the field of education